Eulepidotis juncida is a moth of the family Erebidae first described by Achille Guenée in 1852. It is found in the Neotropics, including Mexico, Honduras, Costa Rica, Peru, French Guiana, Venezuela, Bolivia and Colombia.

The larvae feed on Inga fagifolia.

References

Moths described in 1852
juncida